Joseph Henry Good (1775-1857) was an English architect who was clerk of works at the Tower of London, Royal Mint, Kensington Palace and the Royal Pavilion Brighton.

Early life
Good was born in 1775, the son of the Reverend Joseph Good, a Somerset clergyman.

Career
Good was a pupil of Sir John Soane from 1795 to 1799. He became clerk of works at the Tower of London, Royal Mint, Kensington Palace and the Royal Pavilion Brighton, and designed Armourers' Hall in Coleman Street, London (1839–41).

Death 
Good died on 20 November 1857. He is buried at Kensal Green Cemetery.

References

Further reading
Colvin, Howard, (1995) A Biographical Dictionary of British Architects 1600-1840. 3rd edition. New Haven and London: Yale University Press, pp. 414–415.

Architects from London
1775 births
1857 deaths
Burials at Kensal Green Cemetery